Sant'Urbano is a comune (municipality) in the Province of Padua in the Italian region Veneto, located about  southwest of Venice and about  southwest of Padua.

The municipality of Sant'Urbano contains the frazioni (subdivisions, mainly villages and hamlets) Carmignano, Ca' Morosini, and Balduina.

Sant'Urbano borders the following municipalities: Barbona, Granze, Lendinara, Lusia, Piacenza d'Adige, Vescovana, Vighizzolo d'Este, Villa Estense.

Demographic evolution

References

Cities and towns in Veneto